Rose Rwakasisi (born 1945) is a Ugandan author, editor, short story writer, curriculum developer and educator. She was the deputy head teacher of Old Kampala Secondary school, Nakasero secondary school and Kyamate Secondary School in Ntungamo. She is the director of St. Luke secondary schools and a teacher of Biology.

Early life and education
Rwakasisi was born in Buhweju District, Uganda. She holds a degree in botany and zoology and a postgraduate diploma in education. She was awarded a certificate of recognition by the National Book Trust of Uganda for her contribution to children's literature.

Published works

Books
 

 with Violet Barungi
 with Violet Barungi

Short stories
 "In God's palm", in 
 "Serina", in 
 "Yesterday's heroes", in 
 "The leopardess", in 
 "MwAna Mugimu nursing sister's child", in

Educational books

See also 

 Buhweju District 
List of Uganda Women Writers

References 

Living people
1945 births
Ugandan women writers
Ugandan women short story writers
Ugandan short story writers
Ugandan children's writers
Ugandan women children's writers
20th-century Ugandan women writers
20th-century Ugandan writers
21st-century Ugandan women writers
Kumusha
20th-century short story writers
21st-century short story writers